Uzbeks represent a large diaspora in Russia, numbering 1.9 million (January, 2016). Most of the Uzbeks living in Russia are seasonal migrant workers. Most of them have come after the dissolution of the Soviet Union. Due to racial and cultural differences, they are one of the most discriminated-against minorities in Russia, and hence rarely settle outside of the Russian capital, Moscow.

Population
There has been dispute on the actual population of Uzbeks in Russia, with estimates varying from 300,000 (Russian census 2010) to over two million. There has been a decline in numbers since 2015 due to the Russian recession, as most migrants cannot find jobs with a decent salary, and because of that choose to work in other countries such as South Korea.

Religion
Most Uzbek labour migrants are Sunni Muslims, with some long-term workers converting to Eastern Orthodoxy through missionaries.

Discrimination
Racism in the Russian media, such as in this 2014 news article, has exacerbated racism against Uzbeks. Because of this, Uzbek migrants (along with Kyrgyz, Azeris and Tajiks) face violence, discrimination, xenophobia and humiliation. In 2013, there were riots against Uzbeks by ethnic Russians in many Russian cities.  Racially motivated murders of Uzbeks have occurred. In order to make life easier for Uzbek migrants, Russian authorities have put Uzbek translations in some places. While racial violence against Uzbeks has drastically decreased in recent years, Uzbeks have faced difficulties as migrant laborers due to the COVID-19 pandemic, and many have been stuck in facilities for migrants. 

While racism against Kazakhs and Azeris has been very diminished, Uzbeks still face discrimination. In general, among Central Asians and Caucasians, Armenians, Azeris, Georgians, Kazakhs, and Turkmen are seen in a positive light, while Uzbeks, Tajiks, and Kyrgyz people are seen negatively.

See also
 Uzbeks

References

Central Asian diaspora in Russia
Russia